Nikolina Ruseva (born 12 May 1943) is a Bulgarian sprint canoeist who competed in the mid-1960s. At the 1964 Summer Olympics in Tokyo, she was eliminated in the semifinals of the K-1 500 m event.

References
Sports-reference.com profile

1943 births
Bulgarian female canoeists
Canoeists at the 1964 Summer Olympics
Living people
Olympic canoeists of Bulgaria
Place of birth missing (living people)